Benoît Tremblay (born 16 March 1948) was a Canadian politician and a member of the House of Commons of Canada from 1988 to 1997.

Background

Tremblay was born on 16 March 1948 in Val-Brillant, Quebec.  He had a career in Economics and Administration.

Municipal politics

He successfully ran as a candidate of Jean Doré's Rassemblement des citoyens et citoyennes de Montréal (RCM) for the district of Sault-au-Récollet in November 1986.

Tremblay resigned from the City Council on 12 December 1988, after he won a seat to the House of Commons of Canada.

Federal politics

He had been elected as a Progressive Conservative candidate in the district of Rosemont.

Following the 1990 implosion of the Meech Lake Accord, he left the Progressive Conservative party on 26 June 1990. He sat in Parliament as an Independent member and eventually became one of the first members to join the Bloc Québécois party.  He was re-elected in the 1993 under his new party banner.

After serving in the 34th and 35th Canadian Parliaments, Tremblay left Canadian politics as he did not seek a third term in the House of Commons.

Academic life
He is currently a professor at HEC Montréal where he is also the Director of the Desjardins Centre for Studies in Management of Financial Services Cooperatives.

Electoral record (partial)

References

External links
 
Website of the Desjardins Centre for Studies in Management of Financial Services Cooperatives
Benoît Tremblay's Webpage @ HEC Montréal

1948 births
Living people
Bloc Québécois MPs
Progressive Conservative Party of Canada MPs
Members of the House of Commons of Canada from Quebec
Montreal city councillors
Academic staff of HEC Montréal